Jordan Noone  (born 1992) is an American aerospace engineer and the Founding CTO of Relativity Space. He is now a General Partner at Embedded Ventures which he co-founded in 2020 with Jenna Bryant.

Early life and education 

Noone became the first student and youngest individual in the world to get Federal Aviation Administration clearance to fly a rocket to space while leading the Rocket Propulsion Lab at the University of Southern California.

Career

Blue Origin 

In 2013, after his junior year at the University of Southern California, Noone interned with Blue Origin's propulsion group.

SpaceX 
After graduating from the University of Southern California, Noone was hired by SpaceX as an In-Space Propulsion Development Engineer.

Relativity Space 

Noone co-founded Relativity Space, a company building a 3D printer for rockets, with Tim Ellis in 2015. As of October 2019, the company had raised $185 million in equity and grew to over 170 employees.

In September 2020, Noone stepped down as the CTO of Relativity Space, becoming an Executive Advisor to the company.

Patents 
Noone is listed as the inventor on two of Relativity Space's patents: "Real-time adaptive control of additive manufacturing processes using machine learning" and "Real-time adaptive control of manufacturing processes using machine learning."

Recognitions 

Noone was recognized by Forbes in two of their 30 Under 30 lists in 2019 - the Manufacturing and Industry list and the Big Money list.

In 2018, Noone was included on Inc.'s Rising Stars list of Most Inspiring Young Entrepreneurs.

Business Insider recognized Noone on their 2018 "30 And Under: These are the rising stars in tech who are driving innovation" list.

Noone currently holds two patents for real-time adaptive control of manufacturing processes using machine learning, and is skilled at Matlab and Simulink.

References

University of Southern California alumni
American aerospace engineers
American chief technology officers
Living people
People from Pasadena, California
USC Viterbi School of Engineering alumni
American company founders
1992 births